Dharuggi-Rajgan is a village of Rajpoot Chohan cast.Dharuggi-Rajgan is located in the union council Mulhal Mughlan Chakwal District of the Punjab province, Pakistan. The village is located on main Chakwal-Jehlum road.

Populated places in Chakwal District